Wide-Eye is an animated children's television series set in fictional Natterjack Forest. The series consists of a series of ten-minute episodes and is about a wise, old owl who lives in a tall tree with his young son, Little Hoot, and his energetic sidekick, Flea.

Characters

Main characters 

Wide Eye the Owl (voiced by Anton Rodgers) – The star of the show who lives in the tallest tree in the forest with his son, Little Hoot and his sidekick, Flea. Wide Eye is fatherly, gentle and reliable. He watches over all the animals to make sure they are all safe and happy and speaks in a deep voice.
Little Hoot – (voiced by Maria Darling) – Wide Eye's son. He is brave and strong, speaks in a high-pitched voice, has a vivid imagination, can see in the dark and is eager to learn, although like many children, he is sometimes daunted by new challenges.
Flea – (voiced by Jane Horrocks) – Little Hoot's sidekick and best friend. He speaks in a childish English accent, has an enchanting nature, can jump the highest and is always ready to join in with Little Hoot's adventures.
The Natterjack Toads (Nat voiced by Maria Darling, Flo voiced by Jane Horrocks and Jack voiced by Jimmy Hibbert) – Three green and orange toadlets who live and play at Natterjack Pond.
Mother Natterjack – (voiced by Jane Horrocks) – A female orange toad who is mother of the Natterjack Toads.
Great Grandma Toad (voiced by Anton Rodgers) – Another female orange toad who is grandmother of the Natterjack Toads. She wears purple glasses and often cooks healthy food for the natterjack toads to share.
Father Natterjack (voiced by Anton Rodgers) – A male green toad who is father of the Natterjack Toads. 
99 the Centipede – (voiced by Jimmy Hibbert) – Lives in a burrow. Easily distracted, he tries his best to count and match his many pairs of boots, but he keeps losing count and is forced to start over and over again.
Conchita the Chinchilla (voiced by Maria Darling) – The kind-hearted soul of the forest with blue and white ears who speaks in a Chilean accent. Conchita lives under the roots of a tree. She dances and sings as well as cooking South American food for all the forest animals to share. She can often be seen wearing exotic Chilean clothing.
Rangatang the Orangutan – (voiced by Jimmy Hibbert) – Lives in a treehouse. He often plays jokes on the other forest animals as well as bringing fun and games to the forest and running a cornershop.
Hetty Hornet (voiced by Maria Darling) – Lives in a beehive and likes things to be clean and tidy. She always tries to keep the other forest animals on their toes by handing out useful little tasks to keep them busy.
The Fireflies – Several nocturnal fireflies who appear every night of the year in Natterjack Forest. The fireflies make buzzing sounds instead of saying words.
Wily Komodo (voiced by Jimmy Hibbert) – The villain who appears in almost every episode. He almost always causes mischief in Natterjack Forest. He lives in a rocky, roofless den with his young son, Baby Komodo, and because time is never on his side, he causes nothing but mayhem wherever he goes. 
Baby Komodo (voiced by Jane Horrocks) – Wily Komodo's accident-prone son who is still fond of swimming. Although he desperately wants to be as silly as Wily Komodo as well as be friends with the other forest animals, his main skills are dribbling, running, and din-making. 
Batwing the Bat (voiced by Maria Darling) – Wily Komodo's spy. She sleeps upside down in a rocky cave and can fly unaided, even by night.

Guests/Mentioned
 The Moon – A real, faceless, silent moon which appears every night of the year in Natterjack Forest. The moon is not always seen in the sky, but its only role is to brighten up the darkness in the forest between Dusk and Dawn every day of the year. 
 The Sun – A real, silent, faceless, dazzling, hot star which appears during various episodes, including Snapdragon Monster and The Forest Regatta. The sun generally shines in the sky above Natterjack Forest between Dawn and Dusk every day of the year, but, although it is not always seen in the sky and can hurt the forest animals' eyes and make them go blind, it is by far the most important source of energy for life in the forest.

Episodes

2003 British television series debuts
2004 British television series endings
2000s British children's television series
2000s British animated television series
British children's animated drama television series
British preschool education television series
Animated preschool education television series
2000s preschool education television series
BBC children's television shows
Animated television series about birds
Animated television series about insects
Animated television series about reptiles and amphibians
Animated television series about frogs
Animated television series about apes
Animated television series about mammals
CBeebies